Parapsilorhynchus tentaculatus, commonly known as the Khandalla minnow, is indigenous to India.

References

Cyprinid fish of Asia
Freshwater fish of India
Taxa named by Nelson Annandale
Fish described in 1919